Harriet Coverston is an American computer scientist and software developer focused on large-scale secondary storage environments, who has previously participated to various kernel developments in HPC systems. Harriet is an expert in large scale archiving systems, having participated to several large projects and product developments.

Career 
She started her career at Lawrence Livermore National Laboratory in 1967 working on CDC 7600 Livermore Timesharing System   within a team of 5 people. She stayed until 1974 and then moved to Control Data Corporation for 12 years to collaborate on the Cyber 205 Operating System and CDCNET.

In January 1986, she co-founded LSC (Large Scale Configurations) where she was vice-president of technology more than 15 years. LSC was a ISV developing SAM-QFS and QFS, two software dedicated to manage cold and archived data. QFS is a high performance file system and SAM is advanced storage management.

In 2001, Sun Microsystems acquired LSC and Harriet Coverston became distinguished engineer at Sun, a position she occupied until 2010. Oracle  closed the acquisition of Sun early 2010.

She co-founded Versity  in March 2011 with Bruce Gilpin and acts as its CTO since its inception. Versity is a storage ISV developer of archiving software.

Education 
Harriet Coverston received a BA in Mathematics from Florida State University.

Patents 
Harriet participates and co-owns 15 patents:
 File archiving system and method 
 Delegation in a file system with distributed components 
 File system with distributed components 
 Method and system for collective file access using an mmap (memory-mapped file)  
 Dynamic routing of I/O requests in a multi-tier storage environment 
 Dynamic data migration in a multi-tier storage system 
 File archiving system and method 
 Delegation in a file system with distributed components 
 File system with distributed components 
 Method, system, and program for providing data to an application program from a file in a file system 
 Method, system, and program for managing files in a file system 
 Archiving file system for data servers in a distributed network environment 
 Method and apparatus for insuring recovery of file control information for secondary storage systems 
 Method and apparatus for file storage allocation for secondary storage using large and small file blocks

References 

American women computer scientists
American computer scientists